Morrelganj is an upazila of Bagerhat District in the Division of Khulna, Bangladesh.  Morrelganj (Town) consists of 9 wards and 12 mahallas. The area of the town is 15.36 km2. The town has a population of 321153; male 51.76%, female 48.24%. The density of population is 1441per km2. The town has one dak bungalow.

Morrelganj thana was established in 1909 and became an upazila in 1985.

History
Morrelganj is named after the Morrel family. During the British rule Henry Morrel established Kuthi Bari and terrorized the locals by forced labor and torture. In protest, a peasant rebellion spread under the leadership of Rahimullah of Baraikhali, who was killed on 25 November 1861.

During the Bangladesh Liberation War of 1971, 35 people were killed in an encounter between the freedom fighters and the Razakars on 15 August 1971. This is commemorated in the War of Liberation Memorial monument.

Geography
It has 61210 household units and a total area 460.91 km2.

Morrelganj Upazila (Bagerhat district) is bounded by Bagerhat sadar and Kachua upazilas on the north, Sarankhola and Mathbaria upazilas on the south, Pirojpur sadar and Bhandaria upazilas on the east, Rampal and Mongla upazilas on the west. Main rivers: Baleshwar, Ghasiakhali, Panguchi and Bhola.

Demographics
Population 321153; male 50.48% and female 49.52%; Muslim 86.59%, Hindu 13.28% and other 0.13%.

Economy
The main occupations are: Agriculture 35.49%, fishing 3.65%, agricultural labourer 20.73%, wage labourer 6.85%, commerce 11.85%, transport 1.4%, service 5.6%, others 14.43%.

There is a big Shopping Place in Morrelgonj Called Morrelgonj Center or Morrelgonj Bazar and it is the big Business place of Morrelgonj.

Points of interest
Neelkuthi (1849) and Rajbari at Bonogram.  The nearby Mosque City of Bagerhat, a UNESCO World Heritage Site, is a formerly lost city, located in the suburbs of Bagerhat city in Bagerhat District, in the Khulna Division of southwest of Bangladesh. Bagerhat is about 15 miles south east of Khulna and 200 miles southwest of Dhaka.  The mosque city is situated at the confluence of Ganges and Brahmaputra Rivers

Administration
Morrelganj Upazila is divided into Morrelganj Municipality and 16 union parishads: Baharbunia, Balaibunia, Banagram, Baraikhali, Chingrakhali, Daibagnyahati, Hoglabunia, Hogla Pasha, Jiudhara, Khuolia, Morrelganj, Nishanbaria, Panchakaran, Putikhali, Ramchandrapur, and Teligati. The union parishads are subdivided into 120 mauzas and 181 villages.

Morrelganj Municipality is subdivided into 9 wards and 12 mahallas.

Transport
Roads: Paved (pucca) 59 km, improved (semi pucca) 82 km and mud road 765 km.  The traditional use of the palanquin for transportation is nearly extinct.

Education

The average literacy is 49.5%; of which male literacy is 53.9% and female literacy is 40%.
Morrelganj has many educational institutions: college 6, high school 76, madrasa 291, most noted of which is Govt. S.M College (1968),  Fulhata High School (1946), Daibajnahati BM High School (1915), A C Laha Pilot High School (1924), Shahid Sheikh Rasel Mujib High School(1995) Bipin Kamol Balika Vidyalaya, Maa Babar Reen College Surjumukhi, Baharbunia, Hironmoy Halder Karigori College, Baharbunia, Nihar Halder Sanskrit College, Baharbunia, Baharbunia Halderbari Dakhil Mohila Madrasa, Surjumukhi Halder Bari Prathomik Vidyalaya, Baharbuna. KP sarkari prathomic vidyalaya. Baharbunia

Notable people 
 Shahid Rahimullah, died 1861, leader of an Indigo Revolt.
 Liakat Ali Khan, born 1951, student freedom fighter commander in 1971.

See also
 Upazilas of Bangladesh
 Districts of Bangladesh
 Divisions of Bangladesh

References

Upazilas of Bagerhat District
Bagerhat District
Khulna Division